David Janssen (born David Harold Meyer) (March 27, 1931February 13, 1980) was an American film and television actor who is best known for his starring role as Richard Kimble in the television series The Fugitive (1963–1967). Janssen also had the title roles in three other series: Richard Diamond, Private Detective; O'Hara, U.S. Treasury and Harry O.

In 1996 TV Guide ranked him number 36 on its 50 Greatest TV Stars of All Time list.

Early life

David Janssen was born on March 27, 1931, in Naponee, a village in Franklin County in southern Nebraska, to Harold Edward Meyer, a banker, and Berniece Graf, a former Miss Nebraska and Ziegfeld girl.  Following his parents' divorce in 1935, his mother moved with five-year-old David to Los Angeles, and married Eugene Janssen in 1940. Young David used his stepfather's name after he entered show business as a child.

He attended Fairfax High School, where he excelled on the basketball court, setting a school scoring record that lasted over 20 years. His first film part was at the age of thirteen, and by the age of twenty-five he had appeared in twenty films and served two years as an enlisted man in the United States Army. During his Army days, Janssen became friends with fellow enlistees Martin Milner and Clint Eastwood while posted at Fort Ord, California.

Acting career

Janssen appeared in many television series before he landed programs of his own. In 1956, he and Peter Breck appeared in John Bromfield's syndicated series Sheriff of Cochise in the episode "The Turkey Farmers". Later, he guest-starred on NBC's medical drama The Eleventh Hour in the role of Hal Kincaid in the 1962 episode "Make Me a Place", with series co-stars Wendell Corey and Jack Ging. He joined friend Martin Milner in a 1962 episode of Route 66 as the character Kamo in the episode "One Tiger to a Hill."

Janssen starred in four television series of his own:
 Richard Diamond, Private Detective (1957–1960), a CBS/Four Star hit series that also introduced Mary Tyler Moore, showing only her legs, and Barbara Bain as Diamond's girlfriend.
 The Fugitive (1963–1967), the hit Quinn Martin-produced series, about a Midwest doctor wrongly convicted of murdering his wife;
 O'Hara, U.S. Treasury (1971–1972), one of Jack Webb's Mark VII Limited productions for Universal Studios, as a government agent investigating counterfeiters and other federal crimes;
 Harry O (1974–1976), as a disabled San Diego-based private eye.

At the time of its airing in August 1967, the final episode of The Fugitive held the record for the greatest number of American homes with television sets to watch a series finale — 72 percent. In 1996 TV Guide ranked The Fugitive number 36 on its 50 Greatest Shows of All Time list.

His films include: To Hell and Back, the biography of Audie Murphy, who was the most decorated American soldier of World War II; Hell to Eternity, a 1960 American World War II biopic starring Jeffrey Hunter as a Hispanic boy who fought in the Battle of Saipan and who was raised by Japanese-American foster parents; John Wayne's Vietnam war film The Green Berets; opposite Gregory Peck, in the space story Marooned, in which Janssen played an astronaut sent to rescue three stranded men in space; and The Shoes of the Fisherman, as a television journalist in Rome reporting on the election of a new Pope (Anthony Quinn). 

He also played pilot Harry Walker in the 1973 action movie Birds of Prey. He starred as a Los Angeles police detective trying to clear himself in the killing of an apparently innocent doctor in the 1967 film Warning Shot, which was shot during a break in the spring and summer of 1966 between the third and fourth seasons of The Fugitive.

Janssen played an alcoholic in the 1977 TV movie A Sensitive, Passionate Man, which co-starred Angie Dickinson, and played an engineer who devises an unbeatable system for blackjack in the 1978 made-for-TV movie Nowhere to Run, co-starring Stefanie Powers and Linda Evans. Janssen's impressively husky voice was used to good effect as the narrator for the TV mini-series Centennial (1978–79); he also appeared in the final episode. And in 1979 he starred in the made-for-TV mini series S.O.S. Titanic as John Jacob Astor, playing opposite Beverly Ross as his wife, Madeleine.

Though Janssen's scenes were cut from the final release, he also appeared as a journalist in the film Inchon, which he accepted in order to work with Laurence Olivier, who played General Douglas MacArthur. At the time of his death, Janssen had just begun filming a television movie playing the part of Father Damien, the priest who dedicated himself to the leper colony on the island of Molokai, Hawaii. The part was eventually reassigned to actor Ken Howard of the CBS series The White Shadow.

Personal life

Janssen was married twice. His first marriage was to model and interior decorator Ellie Graham, whom he married in Las Vegas on August 25, 1958.  They divorced in 1968. In 1975, he married actress and model Dani Crayne Greco. They remained married until Janssen's death.

Death
Janssen was a heavy drinker who smoked up to four packs of cigarettes a day. He died from a sudden heart attack in the early morning of February 13, 1980, at his beachfront home in Malibu, California, at the age of 48. At the time of his death, Janssen was filming the television movie Father Damien. Janssen was buried at the Hillside Memorial Park Cemetery in Culver City, California. A non-denominational funeral was held at the Jewish chapel of the cemetery on February 17. Suzanne Pleshette delivered the eulogy at the request of Janssen's widow. Milton Berle, Johnny Carson, Tommy Gallagher, Richard Harris, Stan Herman, Rod Stewart and Gregory Peck were among Janssen's pallbearers. Honorary pallbearers included Jack Lemmon, George Peppard, James Stewart and Danny Thomas.

According to friend and Fugitive co-star Barry Morse, "David Janssen was well known as one of the hardest working actors in the USA", regularly working 12–14 hours a day, and he kept working until his early death.

For his contribution to the television industry, David Janssen has a star on the Hollywood Walk of Fame located on the 7700 block of Hollywood Boulevard.

Selected filmography

 It's a Pleasure (1945) as Davey / boy referee (uncredited)
 Swamp Fire (1946) as Emile's Eldest Son (uncredited)
 No Room for the Groom (1952) as Soldier (scenes deleted)
 Francis Goes to West Point (1952) as Cpl. Thomas
 Untamed Frontier (1952) as Lottie's Dance Partner (uncredited)
 Bonzo Goes to College (1952) as Jack (uncredited)
 Yankee Buccaneer (1952) as Beckett
 Back at the Front (1952) as Soldier (uncredited)
 Leave It to Harry (1954) as Quiz Show Host (short subject)
 Chief Crazy Horse (1955) as Lt. Colin Cartwright
 Cult of the Cobra (1955) as Rico Nardi
 Francis in the Navy (1955) as Lt. Anders
 The Private War of Major Benson (1955) as Young Lieutenant
 To Hell and Back (1955) as Lieutenant Lee
 All That Heaven Allows (1955) as Freddie Norton (uncredited)
 The Square Jungle (1955) as Jack Lindsay
 Never Say Goodbye (1956) as Dave Heller
 The Toy Tiger (1956) as Larry Tripps
 Francis in the Haunted House (1956) as Police Lieutenant Hopkins
 Away All Boats (1956) as Talker (uncredited)
 Mr. Black Magic (1956) as Master of Ceremonies (short subject)
 Showdown at Abilene (1956) as Verne Ward
 The Girl He Left Behind (1956) as Capt. Genaro
 Lafayette Escadrille (1958) as Duke Sinclair
 Hell to Eternity (1960) as Sgt. Bill Hazen
 Dondi (1961) as Dealey
 King of the Roaring 20s – The Story of Arnold Rothstein (1961) as Arnold Rothstein
 Ring of Fire (1961) as Sergeant Steve Walsh
 Twenty Plus Two (1961) as Tom Alder
 Man-Trap (1961) as Vince Biskay
 My Six Loves (1963) as Marty Bliss
 Warning Shot (1967) as Sgt. Tom Valens
 The Green Berets (1968) as George Beckworth
 The Shoes of the Fisherman (1968) as George Faber
 Where It's At (1969) as A.C.
 Marooned (1969) as Ted Dougherty
 Generation (1969) as Jim Bolton
 Macho Callahan (1970) as Diego Callahan
 Once Is Not Enough (1975) as Tom Colt
 The Swiss Conspiracy (1976) as David Christopher
 Two-Minute Warning (1976) as Steve
 Warhead (1977) as Tony Stevens
 Golden Rendezvous (1977) as Charles Conway
 Covert Action (1978) as Lester Horton
 Inchon (1981) as David Feld (scenes deleted after premiere; final film role; filmed in 1979; released posthumously)

Television films

 Belle Sommers (1962) as Danny Castle
 Night Chase (1970) as Adrian Vico
 The Longest Night (1972) as Alan Chambers
 Moon of the Wolf (1972) as Sheriff Aaron Whitaker
 Hijack (1973) as Jake Wilkenson
 Birds of Prey (1973) as Harry Walker
 Harry O – Such Dust As Dreams Are Made On (1973) as Harry Orwell
 Pioneer Woman (1973) as Robert Douglas
 Harry O – Smile Jenny, You're Dead (1974) as Harry Orwell
 Don't Call the Police (1974) as Harry Orwell
 Fer-de-Lance (1974) as Russ Bogan
 Stalk the Wild Child (1976) as Dr. James Hazard
 Mayday at 40,000 Feet! (1976) as Captain Pete Douglass
 A Sensitive, Passionate Man (1977) as Michael Delaney
 Superdome (1978) as Mike Shelley
 Nowhere to Run (1978) as Harry Adams
 S.O.S. Titanic (1979) as John Jacob Astor
 The Golden Gate Murders (1979) as Det. Sgt. Paul Silver
 High Ice (1980) as Glencoe MacDonald
 City in Fear (1980) as Vince Perrino (released posthumously)
 Father Damien: The Leper Priest – 1980 (Incomplete – Replaced by Ken Howard)

Television

 Boston Blackie (1 episode, 1951) as Armored Car Driver (uncredited)
 Lux Video Theatre (3 episodes, 1955–1956) as Johnny Reynolds Jr. / Joe Davies / Ralph
 Matinee Theatre (1 episode, 1956) as Paul Merrick
 Sheriff of Cochise (1 episode, 1956) as Arnie Hix
 Conflict (1 episode, 1957) as Sid Lukes
 You Are There (1 episode, 1957) as Great Dalton
 U.S. Marshal (1 episode, ????) 
 Alcoa Theatre (2 episodes, 1957–1958) as Jim McCandless / Mike Harper
 The Millionaire (2 episodes, 1957–1958) as David Barrett / Peter Miller
 Dick Powell's Zane Grey Theater (4 episodes, 1957–1959) as Dix Porter / Seth Larker / Tod Owen / Danny Ensign
 Richard Diamond, Private Detective (77 episodes, 1957–1960) as Richard Diamond / Chuck Garrett
 Westinghouse Desilu Playhouse (1 episode, 1959) as Ross Ingraham
 Death Valley Days (1 episode, 1961) as Dr. Bill Breckenridge
 Adventures in Paradise (1 episode, 1961) as Scotty Bell
 Thriller (1 episode, 1962) 
 Target: The Corruptors (1x19 The Middle Man, 1962) as Robbie Wilson
 General Electric Theater (1 episode, 1962) as Pat Howard
 Follow the Sun (2 episodes, 1962) as Johnny Sadowsky
 Checkmate (1 episode, 1962) as Len Kobalsky
 Cain's Hundred (1 episode, 1962) as Dan Mullin
 Kraft Mystery Theatre (1 episode, 1962) 
 Route 66 (S3E1, 1962) as Karno Starling
 The Eleventh Hour (1 episode, 1962) as Hal Kincaid
 The Dick Powell Show (1 episode, 1963) as Kenneth 'Ken' Morgan
 Naked City (2 episodes, 1961–1963) as Carl Ashland / Blair Cameron
 The Fugitive (120 episodes, 1963–1967) as Dr. Richard Kimble / varied aliases
 The Hollywood Palace (1 episode, 1965)
 O'Hara, U.S. Treasury (22 episodes, 1971–1972) as Jim O'Hara / James O'Hara
 Cannon (1 episode, 1973) as Ian Kirk
 Harry O (44 episodes, 1973–1976) as Harry Orwell
 Police Story (1 episode, 1977) as Sgt. Joe Wilson
 The Word (1978) as Steve Randall
 Centennial (1 episode, 1979, and narrator for all 12 episodes, 1978–1979) as Paul Garrett / Narrator
 Biography (1979) as Host

Bibliography
 
 David Janssen – Our Conversations: The Early Years (1965–1972): Volume 1 Michael Phelps 
 David Janssen: Our Conversations: The Final Years: (1973–1980): Volume 2  Michael Phelps

References

External links

 
 The David Janssen Archive
 

1931 births
1980 deaths
20th-century American male actors
American male film actors
American male television actors
American people of Irish descent
Burials at Hillside Memorial Park Cemetery
Fairfax High School (Los Angeles) alumni
Male actors from Nebraska
People from Franklin County, Nebraska
United States Army soldiers